Luxe, Calme et Volupté is a 1904 oil painting by the French artist Henri Matisse. Both foundational in the oeuvre of Matisse and a pivotal work in the history of art, Luxe, Calme et Volupté is considered the starting point of Fauvism. This painting is a dynamic and vibrant work created early on in his career as a painter. It displays an evolution of the Neo-Impressionist style mixed with a new conceptual meaning based in fantasy and leisure that had not been seen in works before.

Background
Prior to the beginning of his Fauvist period Matisse had been formally educated in the arts and started his career copying works from old masters. His first original works resembled those from his education. After he left school, influence from Impressionism developed into his work and gradually led him to the Post-Impressionist movement where this style stuck with him until it evolved into Fauvism. Matisse frequently purchased works from artists such as Cézanne, Van Gogh, and Gauguin during his time before Fauvism that influenced his painting and the development of his style over time.

Luxe, Calme et Volupté was painted by Matisse in 1904, after a summer spent working in St. Tropez on the French Riviera alongside the Neo-Impressionist painters Paul Signac and Henri-Edmond Cross. Signac purchased the work, which was exhibited in 1905 at the Salon des Indépendants.

The painting's title comes from the poem L'Invitation au voyage, from Charles Baudelaire's volume Les Fleurs du mal (The Flowers of Evil):

Style
The painting is Matisse's most important work in which he used the Divisionist technique advocated by Signac. Divisionism is created by individual dots of colors placed strategically on the canvas in order to appear blended from a distance; Matisse's variant of this style is created by numerous short dashes of color to develop the forms that are seen in the image. He first adopted the style after reading Signac's essay "D'Eugène Delacroix au Néo-impressionisme" in 1898.

The simplification of form and details is a trademark of Fauvist landscapes in which artists intentionally created artificial structures that distorted the reality of images. Many of these same qualities can be found in Matisse's other works. Other Fauvist painters worked on large scale landscapes that did not focus as much on figures within the composition as with Matisse's works.

Interpretations
Scholars suggest that interpreting the paintings requires the viewer to acknowledge its resistance to interpretation. Matisse's previous works were all firmly rooted in the visual aspects of Post-Impression leading scholars to question how his work had taken such a drastic turn into a depiction of fantasy. David Carrier writes that the painting is ambiguous and lacks reference to any of its supposed sources of inspiration. Despite the literary source for the work's title, Luxe, Calme, et Volupté, it is not related to the narrative of poem in any way.

History
1905, in the collection of Paul Signac, purchased from Matisse
Collection Ginette Signac, daughter of the artist
1982, accepted by the French state for Les Musées Nationaux (11/02/1982)
1982 to 1985, attributed to the Musée National d'Art Moderne, Paris
1985, moved to Musée d'Orsay

Exhibitions
Salon de la Société des artistes indépendants. 21st exhibition, Paris, France, 1905
Henri Matisse, chapelle, peintures, dessins, sculptures, Paris, France, 1950
Le Fauvisme, Paris, France, 1951
Henri Matisse, New York, USA, 1951
Henri Matisse, Cleveland, USA, 1952
Henri Matisse, Chicago, USA, 1952
Henri Matisse, San Francisco, USA, 1952
Salon d'automne, Paris, France, 1955
Henri Matisse, retrospective exhibition, Paris, 1956
Cent chefs-d'oeuvre de l'art français, 1750–1950, Paris, 1957
Les sources du XXème siècle - les arts en Europe de 1884 à 1914, Paris, 1960
Les Fauves, Paris, 1962
Le Fauvisme français et les débuts de l'Expressionnisme allemand, Paris, 1966
Le Fauvisme français et les débuts de l'Expressionisme allemand, Munich, Germany, 1966
Neo-Impressionism, New York, 1968
Baudelaire, Paris, 1968
Henri Matisse. Exposition du centenaire, Paris, 1970
Henri Matisse, Zurich, Switzerland, 1982
Henri Matisse, Düsseldorf, Germany, 1983
De Manet à Matisse, 7 ans d'enrichissement au musée d'Orsay, Paris, 1990
Le Fauvisme ou "l'épreuve du feu", éruption de la modernité en Europe, Paris, 1999
1900, Paris, 2000
Méditerranée - De Courbet à Matisse, Paris, 2000
Le néo-impressionnisme de Seurat à Paul Klee, Paris, 2005

Bibliography
Schneider, P., Matisse, Paris, 1984
Mathieu, Caroline, Guide du Musée d'Orsay, Paris, 1986
Laclotte, Michel, Le Musée d'Orsay, Paris, 1986
Compin, Isabelle - Lacambre, Geneviève - Roquebert, Anne, Musée d'Orsay. Catalogue sommaire illustré des peintures, Paris, 1990
Lobstein Dominique, 48/14 La revue du Musée d'Orsay, no. 20, Paris, 2005
Lobstein Dominique, Les Salons au XIXe siècle. Paris, capitale des arts, Paris, 2006
Cogeval Guy, Le Musée d'Orsay à 360 degrés, Paris, 2013
Monod-Fontaine, Isabelle, Matisse. La figura, Ferrare, 2014

Notes

References
 
 
 
 
 
UCLA Art Council, Leymarie, J., Read, H. E., & Lieberman, W. S. (1966). Henri Matisse retrospective 1966. Los Angeles: UCLA Art Gallery.

External links
 Henri Matisse, Luxe, Calme et Volupté, Musée d'Orsay, Paris

Paintings by Henri Matisse
1904 paintings
Les Fleurs du mal in popular culture
Paintings in the collection of the Musée d'Orsay
Ships in art
Food and drink paintings
Fauvism